See also Riverview (disambiguation).

Riverview Middle School may refer to several different schools:

Canada

Riverview Middle School in Devon, Alberta
Riverview Middle School - in Riverview, New Brunswick

United States

Riverview Middle School in Bay Point, California
Riverview Middle School In Rio Vista, California
Riverview Middle School in Dawsonville, Georgia
Riverview Middle School in Plymouth, Wisconsin